Raymond Rosier (6 March 1924 – 8 April 1961) was a Belgian middle-distance runner. He competed in the men's 800 metres at the 1948 Summer Olympics.

References

External links
 

1924 births
1961 deaths
Athletes (track and field) at the 1948 Summer Olympics
Belgian male middle-distance runners
Olympic athletes of Belgium